Interstate 295 (I-295), sometimes called the Providence Beltway, is an auxiliary Interstate Highway in the US states of Rhode Island and Massachusetts. It is maintained by the Rhode Island Department of Transportation (RIDOT) and the Massachusetts Department of Transportation (MassDOT). I-895 was proposed as a complementary eastern beltway to complete a full loop around the city in the 1960s but was ultimately scrapped in the 1980s.

The southern terminus of I-295 is at its split from I-95 in Warwick, Rhode Island. Among several state highways, it intersects with US Route 6 (US 6) in Johnston, Rhode Island, and US 44 in Smithfield, Rhode Island, before entering North Attleborough, Massachusetts, from Cumberland, Rhode Island. It intersects with US 1 in North Attleborough before arriving at its northern terminus as it merges into I-95 in Attleboro. I-295 is the first highway in Rhode Island to convert to an exclusive mileage-based exit numbering system, having transitioned from a sequential numbering system in 2017. Exit signs north of the interchange with US 6 previously included both milemarkers and exit numbers before being replaced in 2007.

Route description

|-
|
|
|-
|
|
|-
|Total
|
|}

Rhode Island
I-295 serves as a partial circumferential highway around Providence, bypassing the city to the west and north. The southern terminus of I-295 is located in Warwick (I-95 exit 11 northbound/12B southbound). The complex interchange involves access between I-95, I-295, and Route 113, which is labeled exit 1A (the interchange with I-95 is unnumbered). Immediately after this interchange, I-295 crosses the Blackstone River and passes Warwick Mall, which lies on a property outlined by the interchange and the two highways. The mall is accessed via exit 1B, which provides partial access to Route 2 (northbound I-295 exits to northbound Route 2, while southbound I-295 exits to southbound Route 2). Exits 3A and 3B provide access to Route 37 within the town of Cranston. Exit 6 for Route 14 is next, known locally as Plainfield Pike, which defines the border between Cranston and Johnston. Exit 7 provides access to a local industrial park. There is a complex interchange with US 6 and US 6A in Johnston, labeled exits 9A, 9B, and 9C, which involves near overlap between US 6 and I-295 (US 6 uses the collector–distributor lanes along the side of I-295 briefly, and access from US 6 westbound to I-295 southbound requires the use of a special double-loop ramp at exit 9B). A diamond interchange (exit 10) with Route 5 is the last exit in Johnston, and the highway enters Smithfield and immediately has a cloverleaf interchange (exits 12A and 12B) with US 44. After another cloverleaf interchange (exits 15A and 15B) with Route 7, the highway begins a gentle curve eastward toward Massachusetts. Within the town of Lincoln, I-295 meets Route 146 (exits 18A and 18B), the Eddie Dowling Highway, part of the larger Worcester–Providence Pike. There are two interchanges in the town of Cumberland, being Route 122 (exit 20) and Route 114 (exit 22).

Massachusetts
Entering Massachusetts in the town of North Attleborough, there is a cloverleaf interchange (exits 2A and 2B) with US 1 before reaching its northern terminus (locally eastbound) in Attleboro at exits 4A and 4B with I-95.

History

In the mid-1950s, the state of Rhode Island introduced plans to build a beltway around Providence, then known as Relocated Rhode Island Route 5 for inclusion in the Interstate Highway System. A modified version of this plan was accepted, with another modification done in 1960 resulting in a planned alignment. Construction began in 1964, and the original route was completed by 1975. The original intention was to have I-295 act as a full ring road around the Providence metropolitan area with the alignment roughly following Rhode Island Route 37 across Narragansett Bay and continuing in a northern direction with a major interchange located at I-195 exit 2 in Swansea, Massachusetts, before heading west toward Attleboro. Due to opposition from communities in the proposed alignment, cancelation occurred in 1982.

The original alignment of I-84 called for an east–west right-of-way from the Rhode Island and Connecticut state line (Willimantic, Connecticut, and Foster, Rhode Island) to Johnston, Rhode Island, through the Scituate Reservoir. The connection with I-295 was planned as a full interchange with flyover ramps. Due to fears of runoff affecting the Scituate Reservoir, this alignment of I-84 was canceled. This interchange (exits 9A, 9B, and 9C) currently acts as multiplex for US 6 with a partial interchange with Rhode Island Route 10 further down US 6. The ramp that was originally going to be used to merge onto I-84 west from I-295 north has been converted to a turnaround ramp (exit 9B) from I-295 north to I-295 South.

Exit list
In 2016, it was announced that both Rhode Island and Massachusetts interchanges were to receive new exit numbers based on route mileage in accordance with federal standards. Massachusetts was scheduled to start in 2016, though the project was indefinitely postponed in mid-2016. On November 18, 2019, MassDOT confirmed the project will begin in late summer 2020. Massachusetts exits were renumbered over two nights on January 3–4, 2021. Rhode Island exits were renumbered from November 27, 2017, to December 8, 2017.

References

External links

95-2 Rhode Island
2 Rhode Island
95-2
95-2
Providence metropolitan area
Transportation in Bristol County, Massachusetts
Transportation in Kent County, Rhode Island
Transportation in Providence County, Rhode Island